Borsania is a monotypic moth genus of the family Noctuidae. Its only species, Borsania mendozina, is found in Mendoza Province, Argentina. Both the genus and species were first described by Paul Köhler in 1952.

References

Cuculliinae
Monotypic moth genera